During the 1997-98 season Vicenza competed in Serie A, Coppa Italia and UEFA Cup Winners' Cup.

Season summary
Vicenza reached the semi-finals of the Cup Winners' Cup. They only avoided relegation by one point.

Kit
Vicenza's kit was manufactured by Lotto and sponsored by Pal Zileri.

First-team squad
Squad at end of season

Left club during season

Competitions

Serie A

League table

Matches

UEFA Cup Winners' Cup 

Eightfinals

Quarterfinals

Semifinals

References

Vicenza Calcio
L.R. Vicenza seasons